Benzoxepin is an oxygen-containing bicyclic molecule consisting of an oxepin ring and a benzene ring.  There are three isomers, varying in where the oxygen is positioned in the oxepin heterocycle relative where the benzene is fused to it.

Natural occurrence 
1-Benzoxepin, with the oxygen closest to the benzene, is found in the skeleton of several fungal metabolites.

2-Benzoxepin skeletons are likewise found in fungal metabolites.

3-Benzoxepin, with the oxygen furthest from the benzene, is the core of natural products such as perilloxin from Perilla frutescens (variant Acuta) and tenual and tenucarb from Asphodeline tenuior.

References

Oxepines
Benzoxepines